Rock County Public Schools is a school district in Nebraska, United States.

Schools
Schools include:
 Bassett Grade School (Bassett)
 Rock County High School (Bassett)

References

External links

 Rock County Public Schools

School districts in Nebraska
Education in Rock County, Nebraska